Rajparian Wildlife Sanctuary is a protected area located in Daksum, Forest Block, near Anantnag city in Anantnag district of Jammu and Kashmir, India. This area was protected as a game reserve for hangul during the Maharaja's period, prior to 1948. In 1981, it was upgraded to the Rajparian Wildlife Sanctuary.

Flora and fauna
The vegetation types present in the Rajparian Wildlife Sanctuary include dense coniferous forests and sub-alpine pastures. In dense coniferous forests, kail pine, spruce, fir, birch, deodar and juniper trees are predominant.

The Rajparian Wildlife Sanctuary is abode to many species of animals including the Himalayan black bear, hangul, and musk deer. A number of species of wild birds are also found in the sanctuary.

Disturbance
In 1970, the Government of Kashmir constructed a sheep breeding farm on 1300 hectares of prime wintering area of the now critically endangered hangul. This sheep breeding farm is believed to have had an adverse effect on the movement of hangul in this area. Besides, the sanctuary has also been disturbed due to excessive grazing by the livestock of non-local Bakarwals.

References

National parks in Jammu and Kashmir
1981 establishments in Jammu and Kashmir
Kashmir
Protected areas established in 1981